Fort Sturgeon (1776–1780) was the first trading post on the North Saskatchewan River. It was located about 4 miles west of Prince Albert, Saskatchewan. It and was also called Peter Pond Fort, Fort Pond, Fort la Prairie, Fort des Prairies, Lower Settlement and Fort Sturgeon River.

It was located on the north bank of the river just east of the mouth of the Sturgeon River (Saskatchewan) in the Aspen parkland country. To the south the grassland made a sort of "bay" into the forest. The woods to the north provided furs and the grassland to the south buffalo for food.

About 1775 a group of "Pedlars" (independent traders from Montreal) were downriver near the old Fort de la Corne.  Seeing the disadvantages of competition they formed a pool (in either 1775 or 1776) which by 1779 became the North West Company. Among them were Joseph Frobisher, Peter Pond, Peter Pangman, Nicholas Montour, William Bruce and Bartholomew Blondeau. In 1776 they moved upriver and built Fort Sturgeon. In the spring of 1778 Peter Pond set off with 5 canoes and 20 men, crossed the Methye Portage for the first time and wintered 30 miles south of Lake Athabasca. He returned next year with excellent furs, thereby opening up the Athabasca Country. In 1778 Pangman and Blondeau built a fort upstream near Silver Grove, Saskatchewan. In 1779 William Tomison of the HBC came up from Cumberland House and traded while the Pedlars were away. The post had more Indian troubles than most and there were several killings on both sides. In 1777 three men from Fort Sturgeon were killed allegedly for maltreatment of the Indians. In 1780 Indians burnt the fort to the ground when the traders were away.

The Pedlars returned and built a new post "a little below the old House". Morton guesses this was on the north bank opposite Betts Island 1.5 miles above the Prince Albert bridge. Peter Fidler passed by in 1792 and saw only ruins. In 1794 David Grant had a post on the Sturgeon River but did poorly because of NWC competition and inability to control his men. The XY Company (1798–1804) had a post two miles above the Sturgeon and both the HBC and NWC built competing post on the Sturgeon River itself. Innis mentions a "Hudson's House" built in 1776 above Prince Albert. The site is marked by a cairn at the end of Peter Pond Road off highway 3 four miles east of Prince Albert. The original site may have been washed away by the river.

See also
Saskatchewan River fur trade

References

Further reading
Elizabeth Browne Losey, "Let Them be Remembered: The Story of the Fur Trade Forts, 1999
Arthur Morton, "A History of the Canadian West", c. 1936

Pedlars (fur trade)
North West Company forts
Forts in Saskatchewan
North Saskatchewan River